The Macchi L.2 was an Italian biplane flying boat developed from the earlier Macchi L.1, itself a copy of a captured Austrian Lohner flying boat.

Development
In an attempt to improve the performance of the L.1 flying-boat Macchi, the design was improved with a reduced span on the swept biplane wings and a more powerful  Isotta Fraschini V.4B engine. The L.2 was a three-bay unequal-span biplane flying boat with a two-man crew in side-by-side cockpits. It was powered by a single Isotta Fraschini engine, strut-mounted between the two wings and driving a pusher propeller. It was armed with a single machine gun on a trainable mounting and could also carry four light bombs. Ten L.2s were delivered to the Italian Navy, but they were soon replaced by the newer L.3.

Operators

Italian Navy Aviation

Specifications (L.2)

See also

References

 

1910s Italian military reconnaissance aircraft
Flying boats
L.02
Military aircraft of World War I
Single-engined pusher aircraft
Biplanes
Aircraft first flown in 1916